Pitbull is a 2005 Polish action film directed by Patryk Vega.

Cast 
 Marcin Dorociński – Slawomir Desperski "Despero"
 Janusz Gajos – Zbigniew Chyb "Benek"
 Andrzej Grabowski – Jacek Goc "Gebels"
 Rafał Mohr – Krzysztof Magiera "Nielat"
 Krzysztof Stroiński – Metyl 
  – Włodzimierz Barszczyk "Barszczu"
 Weronika Rosati – Dżemma
 Ryszard Filipski – Wor

References

External links 

2005 action films
2005 films
Polish action films
2000s Polish-language films